Köln-Mülheim is a railway station situated at Mülheim, Cologne in western Germany. It is served by several regional trains, the S6 and S11 lines of the Rhine-Ruhr S-Bahn and the 13 and 18 lines of Cologne Stadtbahn.

History 

In the 19th century there were several stations in Mülheim, since all the private railway companies had separate lines and railway facilities.

The stations of the Cologne-Minden Railway Company (CME) on the line between Cologne and Duisburg and the Bergisch-Märkische Railway Company (Bergisch-Märkische Eisenbahn-Gesellschaft, BME) on the Gruiten–Cologne-Deutz railway) were next to each other in Buchheim-Strasse (now Wiener Platz). The station of the Rhenish Railway Company (Rheinische Eisenbahn-Gesellschaft, RhE) on the Troisdorf–Mülheim-Speldorf railway was built outside the town at the site of the current Cologne-Mülheim station.

After the nationalisation of the railway companies there was long consideration of how to consolidate rail operations at one site. Eventually it was decided to tear down stations of the CME and BME and move the lines serving them to the east. Construction began in 1903 and on 1 July 1909 the new station was inaugurated and the all freight and passenger traffic were routed over the rerouted lines.

Today the station is a hub for regional and S-Bahn traffic in northeastern Cologne and an important point of interchange between regional and local transport.

Historical development 
 1874: Opening of the  Troisdorf–Mülheim-Speldorf railway of the Rhenish Railway Company
 1909: Construction of the station at its present site in Mülheim
 1944: Destruction of the station building in bombing raids
 1951: Reconstruction of the station building in a simplified form
 1975: Opening of S-Bahn operations (Bergisch Gladbach–Cologne–Köln-Chorweiler)
 1990: Opening of the S-Bahn main line
 1997: Opening of the underground Stadtbahn station
 since 2004: Reconstruction of the track network as part of the line upgrade to Köln Messe/Deutz station (low level)

Train services

The station is served by the following services:

Regional services  NRW-Express Aachen - Cologne - Düsseldorf - Duisburg - Essen - Dortmund - Hamm - Paderborn
Regional services  Rhein-Express Emmerich - Wesel - Oberhausen - Duisburg - Düsseldorf - Cologne - Bonn - Koblenz
Local services  Rhein-Wupper-Bahn Bonn-Mehlem - Bonn - Cologne - Solingen - Wuppertal
Rhein-Ruhr S-Bahn services  Essen - Kettwig - Düsseldorf - Cologne - Köln-Nippes
Rhein-Ruhr S-Bahn services  Düsseldorf Airport Terminal - Düsseldorf - Neuss - Cologne - Bergisch Gladbach

References

External links

S6 (Rhine-Ruhr S-Bahn)
S11 (Rhine-Ruhr S-Bahn)
Railway stations in Cologne
Mülheim, Cologne
Railway stations in Germany opened in 1874
Muelheim
Rhine-Ruhr S-Bahn stations